The Lexington Universal Academy (LUA) is a private Islamic school located in Lexington, Kentucky. LUA follows the state curriculum. but also incorporates religion classes and Arabic classes.

History
LUA was founded by the Islamic Society of Central Kentucky in 2003. It first started out as just a school for Islam, but an indoor mosque was built along with a second floor. In 2012, science teacher Brian Radcliffe won Lexmark's INSPIRE Teaching Award.

References

External links

 Official website

Islamic schools in Kentucky
Schools in Lexington, Kentucky
Private middle schools in Kentucky
Private elementary schools in Kentucky
Educational institutions established in 2003
2003 establishments in Kentucky